James Erskine Calder (8 June 1808 – 20 February 1882) was a Surveyor General of the Colony of Tasmania, now an Australian state.

Early life
James Calder was born in Great Marlow, Buckinghamshire, England, the ninth of eleven children of Alexander Calder, a quartermaster at the Royal Military College. James Calder was educated at village schools and from 1822 to 1826 at the college after it had moved to Sandhurst. Calder then joined the Ordnance Survey in England; his interest in this work led his father to seek an appointment from the Colonial Office for James in one of the colonies.

Career in Australia

On 5 June 1829 Calder accepted an appointment as assistant surveyor in Van Diemen's Land (now Tasmania). In July he sailed in the Thames for Hobart Town, at half pay on the voyage. On 21 November he took up his position at full pay under the Surveyor General of Tasmania, Edward Dumaresq.

Calder had a strong physique and gained a reputation for taking on difficult work. He cut a track through the mountains to prepare for Lieutenant-Governor Sir John Franklin's proposed expedition to Macquarie Harbour on the West Coast, Tasmania. On the journey in 1842, Calder once travelled  in 54 hours to bring a return load of supplies weighing , at the same time cutting a section of new track and securing bridges.

On 1 September 1859, Calder was appointed Surveyor General, succeeding James Sprent. Calder appointed reliable surveyors in the districts, providing a good foundation for future survey systems.

Late life and legacy
On 30 June 1870, the position of Surveyor General was abolished and Calder accepted the role of Serjeant-at-arms in parliament. Calder died on 20 February 1882, survived by his wife, two sons and three daughters. Calder River is named in his honour.

References

External links

 
 Some Account of the Wars, Extirpation, Habits, &c., of the Native Tribes of Tasmania, 1875

1808 births
1882 deaths
Surveyors General of Tasmania
Australian surveyors
People from Buckinghamshire
English emigrants to colonial Australia